Chahar Qash (also Romanized as Chahār Qāsh; also known as Chahār Khāsh) is a village in Jaydasht Rural District, in the Central District of Firuzabad County, Fars Province, Iran. At the 2006 census, its population was 91, in 22 families.

References 

Populated places in Firuzabad County